Vauquelin is a Norman-French surname, former first name (Walchelin, Walkelin). It may refer to one of the following :

People
 Vauquelin de Ferrière, the French name of Walkelin(e) de Ferrers (died 1040), a Norman baron of Ferrières-Saint-Hilaire
 Vauquelin de Winchester, the French name of Walkelin (died 1098), the first Norman bishop of Winchester
 Jean Vauquelin (1728-1772), a French naval officer 
 Jean Vauquelin de la Fresnaye (1536-1608), a French poet 
 Kévin Vauquelin (born 2001), a French cyclist
 Nicolas Vauquelin des Yveteaux (1567–1649), a French poet, the son of Jean Vauquelin de la Fresnaye
 Louis Nicolas Vauquelin (1763-1829), a French pharmacist and chemist
 Moise Vauquelin (17th century), a French buccaneer
 Roger Vauquelin des Yveteaux, the president of the 1940s French fascist youth organization Jeunesse Populaire Française

Other
 Vauquelin class destroyer of French Navy
 Vauquelin Square in Montreal

Other spellings
 Jean Wauquelin (died 1452), French writer and translator
 Michel Gauquelin (1928 - 1991), a French psychologist and statistician